The Baton River is a river in the Tasman District of the South Island of New Zealand. A tramping track follows the upper part of the river valley, leading to the Karamea-Leslie track and Kahurangi National Park.

See also
List of rivers of New Zealand

References
Land Information New Zealand - Search for Place Names
 New Zealand Topographical map NZMS 260 sheet: N27

Rivers of the Tasman District
Rivers of New Zealand